Wolfgang Heine (3 May 1861 – 9 May 1944) was a German jurist and social democratic politician. Heine was a member of the Imperial parliament and the Weimar National Assembly, he served as Minister President of the Free State of Anhalt and Prussian Minister of the Interior and Justice.

Biography
Heine was born in Posen, Province of Posen, Kingdom of Prussia (Poznań, Poland) to Otto Heine, a grammar school teacher at the Maria-Magdalena-Gymnasium in Breslau (Wrocław, Poland), and Meta née Bormann. He attended school in Weimar, Hirschberg (Jelenia Góra) and Breslau, and studied natural sciences and law at the Universities of Breslau, Tübingen and Berlin. He worked as a lawyer in Berlin and joined the SPD in 1884.

He was elected a member of the Reichstag in 1898, initially representing Berlin and from 1912 on representing the constituency of Anhalt. After World War I Heine became Minister President of the Free State of Anhalt, Prussian Minister of the Interior and  Prussian Minister of Justice.

Heine was criticized for his attempt to negotiate during the Kapp Putsch of March 1920 and lost his position in the Prussian government. From 1923 to 1925 he was a judge at the Weimar German Constitutional Court (Staatsgerichtshof) and continued to work as a lawyer in Berlin.

At the beginning of the Nazi regime, Heine fled to Switzerland and died in Ascona.

References

External links
 Archive of Wolfgang Heine Papers at the International Institute of Social History

1861 births
1944 deaths
Politicians from Poznań
People from the Province of Posen
German Protestants
Social Democratic Party of Germany politicians
Members of the 10th Reichstag of the German Empire
Members of the 11th Reichstag of the German Empire
Members of the 12th Reichstag of the German Empire
Members of the 13th Reichstag of the German Empire
Members of the Weimar National Assembly
German jurists
University of Breslau alumni
University of Tübingen alumni
Humboldt University of Berlin alumni
Justice ministers of Prussia